Clay Hill is an unincorporated community in Clay County, Florida, United States. It is located in the northwest corner of the county and lies along County Road 218. It is a rural community that serves as a bedroom community for the surrounding areas, and home to several working farms. Agricultural products produced in Clay Hill include beef, cattle, hay, and timber. Employers in the area include a sawmill, auto and small engine repair businesses, a welding and fabrication shop, a tree service, and one general and two convenience stores.  The community is home to two elementary schools (Wilkinson Elementary School and Clay Hill Elementary) and one junior high school (Wilkinson Junior High School).

References

Neighborhoods in Jacksonville, Florida
Unincorporated communities in Florida